Holford is a surname. Notable people with the surname include:

 Castello Holford (1845 - 1905), American author of Aristopia
 David Holford (born 1940), West Indian cricketer
 George Holford (1860–1926), British soldier and courtier
 Karen Holford, Welsh engineer and academic
 John Holford (1909–1997), Royal Navy medical officer
 Margaret Holford (the elder) (1757–1834), English novelist, playwright, and poet
 Margaret Holford (1778–1852), (also published as Margaret Hodson), English poet and translator
 Michael Holford (born 1983), English rugby player
 Patrick Holford, controversial British nutritionist
 Robert Stayner Holford (1808–1892), British politician
 Thomas Holford (1541–1588), Catholic priest and martyr
 Tom Holford (1878–1964), English footballer
 William Holford, Baron Holford (1907–1975), British town planner